Scruton railway station is a restored railway station on the Wensleydale Railway that serves the village of Scruton, in North Yorkshire, England.

History
Opened by the York, Newcastle and Berwick Railway on 6 March 1848 as "Scruton Lane", it was renamed "Scruton" not long afterwards. The station became part of the London and North Eastern Railway upon the railway grouping of 1923 before being taken over by British Railways on nationalisation in 1948. It was closed to passenger traffic by British Railways on 26 April 1954, with goods traffic continuing until 7 May 1956.

Present day

By the time the Wensleydale Railway opened in 2003, Scruton station was a dilapidated and overgrown state. Restoration works were undertaken with the support of Scruton Parish Council and a grant from the Railway Heritage Trust. After completion of the restoration of the structure of the buildings and re-roofing, the Wensleydale Railway signed a sublease with Scruton Parish Council on 27 April 2011 which passed the responsibility for maintaining and restoring the building to the Wensleydale Railway Trust.

On 26 April 2014, Scruton station reopened to coincide with the 60th anniversary of the line's closure to passenger services. A special reopening service was run with Leyland railbus LEV1. By November 2014, although restoration of the building was virtually complete a short length of platform was required for construction to bring it into compliance with modern regulations which require platforms to be at least .

It is hoped to re-open the line and station at a future date once work to upgrade the level crossing equipment is complete.

References

Notes

Sources

External links

 Scruton station on navigable 1947 O. S. map
 YouTube Video of Scruton Railway Station
 YouTube video of the platform extension

Heritage railway stations in North Yorkshire
Railway stations in Great Britain opened in 1848
Railway stations in Great Britain closed in 1954
Railway stations in Great Britain opened in 2014
Former North Eastern Railway (UK) stations
1848 establishments in England